José María Benítez (1790–1855) was a Venezuelan physician and botanist known for his efforts to prevent and combat cholera, and for recognition of the medicinal properties of Cinchona trees to treat malaria.

References

1790 births
1855 deaths
19th-century Venezuelan botanists
19th-century Venezuelan physicians